Chhaang or chhyang is a Nepalese and Tibetan alcoholic beverage also popular in parts of the eastern Himalayas, Yakkha, Limbu, Dura, Newar, Sunuwar, Rai,  Gurung, Magar, Sherpa, Tamang and Lepcha communities. Among the Lepcha, it is called Chi. It is also known as jaarh in Nepal.

Geographical prevalence
Chhaang is consumed by ethnically Tibetan, Ladakhi and Nepalese, and to a lesser degree, by the neighboring nations of  Pakistan and Bhutan.  It is usually drunk at room temperature in summer, but is often served piping-hot in brass bowls or wooden mugs when the weather is colder. The Limbu people of eastern Nepal call the drink Tongba.

Ingredients and drinking

Chhaang is a relative of beer. Barley, millet (finger-millet) or rice grains are used to brew the drink. Semi-fermented seeds of millet are served, stuffed in a barrel of bamboo called a dhungro.  Boiling water is then poured in and sipped through a narrow-bore bamboo tube called a pipsing.

When the boiled barley has cooled, some yeast or dried barm is added and it is left to stand for two or three days after fermentation begins. This concoction is called glum. The barm consists of flour and, in Balti, often has ginger and aconite added to it. After fermentation is complete, water is added to the brew and it is then ready for consumption.

In Lahaul the glum is pressed out by hand instead of by filtering, yielding a rather cloudy drink. The residue of malt can be pressed through a strainer and then mixed with water or milk and used in baking bread or cakes.

Near Mount Everest of Nepal, chhaang is made by passing hot water through fermenting barley, and is then served in a large pot and drunk through a wooden straw.

This beverage is similar to the traditional drink of the Limbus, mandokpenaa thee. 

Nepalese jand refers to the turbid liquor which is obtained by leaching out the extract with water from the fermented mash. Unlike chhang or tongba, jand is served in large mugs. These alcoholic beverages are generated using a traditional starter called murcha. Murcha itself is prepared by using yeast and mold flora of wild herbs in cereal flours.

Aconite and potential toxicity

The plant name Aconite may refer to two plant genera in the family Ranunculaceae, namely Aconitum and Eranthis, although Eranthis is known more usually as Winter Aconite. The plants used in the brewing of Chhaang in Baltistan and Ladakh are, however, almost certainly referable to Aconitum species, which have a long history of use in the folk medicinal systems of Asia.  Aconitum species are amongst the most virulently poisonous plants known, containing a variety of extremely toxic alkaloids, including aconitine and pseudaconitine. 

The use of Aconitum as an additive in beer-brewing  is therefore a practice fraught with the danger of fatal poisoning and should on no account be undertaken by any individual attempting to replicate a traditional Chhaang recipe. Although individual Aconitum species vary somewhat in the degree of their toxicity, all are poisonous and, when used in traditional herbal medicine, are invariably pre-treated in various ways intended to minimise their toxicity, while retaining their assumed therapeutic properties. Nevertheless, numerous fatalities have occurred resulting from such medicinal use e.g. in certain Chinese medicinal soups consumed for their supposed tonic effects, which include augmenting physical strength, boosting the immune system, and dispelling 'wind' and 'dampness'.

Myth
Chhaang is said to be the best remedy to ward off the severe cold of the mountains. It reputedly has many healing properties for conditions like the common cold, fevers, allergic rhinitis, and alcoholism among others.

According to legend, chhaang is also popular with the Yeti, or Himalayan Snowmen, who often raid isolated mountain villages to drink it.

Social correlates
Drinking and making offerings of chhaang are part of many pan-Tibetan social and religious occasions, including settling disputes, welcoming guests, and wooing.

See also

 Alcohol in Nepal
 Raksi – Nepalese and Tibetan distilled alcoholic beverage.
 Tibetan beer
 Tongba
 List of Indian beverages
 List of Tibetan dishes

References

Rice wine
Alcohol in Nepal
Bhutanese cuisine
Indian drinks
Nepalese drinks
Pakistani drinks
Tibetan cuisine
Fermented drinks
Types of beer